"Don't Let It Go to Your Head" was the first single released in anticipation of what was expected to be Fefe Dobson's second album, Sunday Love. The single is available for digital download at online retailers.

There is a promotional CD, sometimes referred to as a DJ single, that includes a 10-second callout in addition to the song itself. It is in a trifold digipack that displays the lyrics and credits.
The song also appears in:
 Fefe Dobson Sunday Love album sampler
 Fefe Dobson Sunday Love in-store album sampler
The album release schedule was pushed back a number of times before its eventual cancellation.

"Don't Let It Go to Your Head" was covered by Lilyjets, a Norwegian girl group, as a single from their debut album 3rd Floor (2006). They also produced an official music video. 

The song was also covered by Jordin Sparks on her second album Battlefield (2009). Shortly after Sparks' album was released Dobson said, "Jordin Sparks just did [that song], which was on Sunday Love, which was very cool. She did kind of, like, a more R&B version of it, which I think is really nice, actually. It was really cool that she didn't try and do a rock version of it, and she did what she's more comfortable with, which I thought was awesome."

Personnel
Tom Lord-Alge - mixing
Kenny Aronoff - drums
Howard Benson - Producer, keyboards + programming
Paul Boshnell - bass
Paul Decarli - Pro Tools editing
Hatsukazu Inagaki - assistant engineer
Keith Nelson - guitar tech
Mike Plotnikoff - recording
Phil X - guitars

Music video 
The official music video has several scenes showing Dobson jumping on a bed and tearing the stuffing out of it. It was directed by Diane Martel.

Jordin Sparks version

American Idol champion Jordin Sparks released her version of the song as the third single from her second studio album, Battlefield (2009). It was released as a digital download in the UK only on January 8, 2010.

References 

Fefe Dobson songs
2005 singles
Songs written by Fefe Dobson
Songs written by Billy Steinberg
Music videos directed by Diane Martel
Jordin Sparks songs
Songs written by Josh Alexander
2005 songs
Island Records singles
Jive Records singles
Song recordings produced by Howard Benson